The Lobo-Marte mine is one of the largest gold mines in Chile and in the world. The mine is located in the north of the country in the Atacama Region. The mine has estimated reserves of 9.77 million oz of gold.

References 

Gold mines in Chile
Mines in Atacama Region
Surface mines in Chile